The participation of Indonesia in the ABU TV Song Festival has occurred eleven times since the inaugural ABU TV Song Festival and began in 2012. Since their début in 2012, the Indonesian entry has been organised by the national broadcaster Televisi Republik Indonesia (TVRI).

History

2012
TVRI is one of the founder members in the ABU TV Song Festivals, having participated in the very first ABU TV Song Festival 2012. Indonesia was the only country to hold a televised selection process for the first ABU TV Song Festival, the selection called "Goes To Korea: ABU Asia Pacific TV Song Festival 2012 Indonesian Final" was held with six singers competing to represent Indonesia in Seoul. The singers all performed covers of existing songs, the winner was selected by a jury.

In Seoul Maria Calista performed "Karena Ku Sanggup" which was written specifically for the ABU TV Song Festival 2012.

2013
Indonesia once again participated in the ABU TV Song Festival in Hanoi, Vietnam. Indonesia opted for an internal selection putting Putri Saigain who had participated in the 2012 selection together with Shella Tiatira, they were announced along with their song "Mimpiku" on 5 July 2013. At the festival they performed 4th before Vietnam and after Hong Kong.

2014
On 26 June 2014 it was announced that Theresia Hutabarat also known as Tere Cia would represent Indonesia in Macau at the third ABU TV Song Festival. The Indonesian entry "Dimana Hatimu" was revealed on 18 July 2014. On 31 August 2015 Indonesia confirmed their intention to host the 2016 ABU TV Song Festival.

2015
Indonesia confirmed their participation in the 2015 Festival on 5 April 2015. Ahead of the 2015 it was announced that the ABU had selected Indonesia to host the 2016 festival in Jakarta. On 15 September 2015 it was announced that the singer Zahra Damariva would represent Indonesia at the event, her song was announced on 12 September 2015 to be "Tak Kembali".

ABU TV Song Festival 2015 bid
At a press conference held on 18 July 2013 it was announced that Indonesia were submitting a bid to host the ABU TV Song Festival 2015. In recent editions, the TV Festival has been held in the host city of the ABU General Assembly, with Istanbul, Turkey playing host to such assembly in 2015. If the bid were to be successful, it would be the first time that the TV Festival has taken place away from the host country of the General Assembly.  The 2014 TV Festival is scheduled to take place in Macau, China, in conjunction with the 52nd ABU General Assembly. Indonesia were unsuccessful in their bid for the 2015 Festival with Istanbul, Turkey being announced as the venue for the 4th festival on 20 October 2014.

Participation overview

Hostings

References 

Countries at the ABU Song Festival